Il letto in piazza (also known as Sex Diary) is a 1976 Italian comedy film written and directed by Bruno Gaburro. It is based on the novel with the same name written by Nantas Salvalaggio.

Cast 
Renzo Montagnani: Luca Reali
Rossana Podestà: Serena
John Ireland: Milton
Franco Bracardi: Adolfo
Daniele Formica: 'Tondino' Novati
Giuseppe Anatrelli: Lattanzi
Giacomo Rizzo:  Luca's friend
Sherry Buchanan 
Gabriele Tinti 
Venantino Venantini
Ugo Fangareggi: "Gandhi", Luca's brother-in-law
Patrizia Webley: Nicole, the pharmacist's wife

See also    
 List of Italian films of 1976

References

External links

1976 films
Italian comedy films
1976 comedy films
Films based on Italian novels
Films scored by Guido & Maurizio De Angelis
Films directed by Bruno Gaburro
1970s Italian films